Stanisławów is a village in Mińsk County, Masovian Voivodeship, in east-central Poland. It is the seat of the gmina (administrative district) called Gmina Stanisławów.

The village has a population of 2,200.

References

External links
 Jewish Community in Stanisławów on Virtual Shtetl
 

Villages in Mińsk County